Crisis intervention is a time-limited intervention with a specific psychotherapeutic approach to immediately stabilize those in crisis.

Implementation 

A crisis can have physical or psychological effects. Usually significant and more widespread, the latter lacks the former's obvious signs, complicating diagnosis. Three factors define crisis: negative events, feelings of hopelessness, and unpredictable events. People who experience a crisis perceive it as a negative event that generate physical emotion, pain, or both. They also feel helpless, powerless, trapped, and a loss of control over their lives. Crisis events tend to occur suddenly and without warning, leaving little time to respond and resulting in trauma. At a global level, when a mass trauma from an event like as a terrorist attack occurs, counselors are trained to provide resources, coping skills, and support to clients to assist them through their crisis. Intervention often begins with an assessment. In countries such as the Czech Republic, crisis intervention is an individual therapy, usually lasting four to six weeks, and includes assistance with housing, food, and legal matters. Long waiting times for resident psychotherapists and in Germany, explicit exclusions of couples therapy and other therapies complicate implementation. In the United States, licensed professional counselors (LPCs) provide mental health care to those in need. Licensed professional counselors focus on psychoeducational techniques to prevent a crisis, consultation to individuals, and research effective therapeutic treatment to deal with stressful environments.

School-based 

The primary goal of school-based crisis intervention is to help restore the crisis-exposed student's basic problem-solving abilities and in doing so, to return the student to their pre-crisis levels of functioning. Crisis intervention services are indirect. People often find school psychologists working behind the scenes, ensuring that students, staff, and parents are well-positioned to realize their natural potential to overcome the crisis. School psychologists are trained professionals who meet continuing education requirements after receiving their degree. They help maintain a safe and supportive learning environment for students by working with other staff, such as school resource officers, law enforcement officers trained as informal counselors, and mentors.

At a school-based level, when a trauma occurs, like a student death, school psychologists are trained to prevent and respond to crisis through the PREPaRE Model of Crisis Response, developed by NASP. PREPaRE provides educational professionals training in roles based on their participation in school safety and crisis teams. PREPaRE is one of the first comprehensive nationally available training curriculums developed by school-based professionals with firsthand experience and formal training.

Misuse 

When using crisis intervention methods for the disabled individual, every effort should first be made to first find other, preventative methods, such as giving adequate physical, occupational and speech therapy, and communication aides including sign language and augmentative communication systems, behavior and other plans, to first help that individual to be able to express their needs and function better.  Crisis intervention methods including restraining holds are sometimes used without first giving the disabled more and better therapies or educational assistance.  Often school districts, for example, may use crisis prevention holds and "interventions" against disabled children without first giving services and supports: at least 75% of cases of restraint and seclusion reported to the U.S. Department of Education in the 2011–12 school year involved disabled children. Also, school districts hide their disabled child's restraint or seclusion from the parents, denying the child and their family the opportunity to recover.

The U.S. Congress has proposed legislation, such as the "Keeping All Students Safe Act", to curtail school district use of restraint and seclusion. Even with bipartisan support, the bill has repeatedly died in committee.

SAFER-R 

The SAFER-R Model, with Roberts 7 Stage Crisis Intervention Model, is model of intervention much used by law enforcement. The model approaches crisis intervention as an instrument to help the client to achieve their baseline level of functioning from the state of crisis. This intervention model for responding to individuals in crisis consists of 5+1 stages.

They are:
Stabilize
Acknowledge
Facilitate understanding
Encourage adaptive coping
Restore functioning or,
Refer

Other models include Lerner and Shelton's 10 step acute stress & trauma management protocol. The SAFER-R model can be used in conjunction with the Assessment Crisis Intervention Trauma Treatment. ACT is a 7-stage crisis intervention model. This model, along with the SAFER-R model, is used to restore one's mental state, but it is also used to prevent any trauma that may occur psychologically during a crisis. It can also help experts determine a solution for those who suffer from mental illness.

Critical incident debriefing 

Critical incident debriefing is a widespread approach to counseling those in a state of crisis. This technique is done in a group setting 24–72 hours after the event occurred, and is typically a one-time meeting that lasts 3–4 hours, but can be done over numerous sessions if needed. Debriefing is a process by which facilitators describe various symptoms related PTSD and other anxiety disorders that individuals are likely to experience due to exposure to a trauma. As a group they process negative emotions surrounding the traumatic event. Each member is encouraged to continue participation in treatment so that symptoms do not worsen.

Many have criticized critical incident debriefing for its effectiveness on reducing harm in crisis situations. Some studies show that those exposed to debriefing are actually more likely to show symptoms of PTSD at a 13-month follow-up than those who were not exposed. Most recipients of debriefing reported that they found the intervention helpful. Based on symptoms found in those who received no treatment at all, some critics state that reported improvement is considered a misattribution, and that the progress would naturally occur without any treatment.

Crisis Worker 
Crisis Workers are helping professionals which have a variety of skills and knowledge as it relates to crisis intervention, suicide intervention, health assessment, counselling and crisis care navigation.

See also 

Mental health first aid
Psychological first aid
Suicide prevention

References

Sources 

Greenstone, J.L. & Leviton, Sharon. (1993, 2002,2011). Elements of crisis intervention: Crises and how to respond to them, Third Edition. Pacific Grove, CA: Brooks/Cole Publishing Company, Thomson Learning.
Greenstone, J.L. (2005). The elements of police hostage and crisis negotiations: Critical incidents and how to respond to them. Binghamton, New York: The Haworth Press, Inc.
Greenstone, J.L.(2008). The Elements of disaster Psychology: Managing psychosocial trauma – An integrated approach to force protection and acute care. Springfield, Illinois: Charles C. Thomas, Publishers.
Greenstone, J.L. & Leviton, Sharon (1981). Hotline: Crisis intervention directory. New York: Facts on File.
Greenstone, J.L. & Leviton, Sharon (1982). Crisis intervention: Handbook for interveners. Dubuque: Kendall-Hunt.
Greenstone, J.L.& Leviton, Sharon. (1983). Crisis intervention. In Raymond Corsini (ED) Encyclopedia of Psychology. New York: John Wiley and Sons.

External links
 Mental Health First Aid USA. (2013). What You Learn. National Council for Behavioral Health.
Responding to persons with mental illness
Crisis intervention teams
Crisis: The Journal of Crisis Intervention and Suicide Prevention 

Counseling
Law enforcement